Sororoditha is a genus of pseudoscorpions in the family Tridenchthoniidae. There is at least one described species in Sororoditha, S. hirsuta.

References

Further reading

External links

 

Tridenchthoniidae
Pseudoscorpion genera